Danny Mitchell (born 8 August 1986) is a retired English mixed martial artist. He is currently the head coach at Asylum Vale Tudo.

Early career

Mitchell became a professional fighter in 2008 and fought the first eight fights of his career in regional promotions mostly throughout his native Northern England, compiling an impressive 8–0 record with 6 stoppages. He then moved onto headlining slots against other European standouts such as fellow future UFC competitors Gunnar Nelson, Nico Musoke and Cathal Pendred.

Ultimate Fighting Championship

With a 14-4-1 record which included wins over former UFC fighters Mitchell was signed by the UFC in December 2013.

Mitchell debuted against Igor Araujo on 8 March 2014 at UFC Fight Night 37 and lost via unanimous decision.

Mitchell was expected to face Li Jingliang at UFC 173. However, Mitchell was forced out of the bout with an injury.

Mitchell next faced Wang Sai on 23 August 2014 at UFC Fight Night 48 in Macau. Mitchell lost the bout via unanimous decision and was subsequently released by the promotion.

European Circuit, Bellator and Retirement

After his release from the UFC he continued to fight in Europe taking fights in the UK and Bulgaria. On July 16, 2016, he fought on Bellator 158 against CJ Meeks, he won the bout by submission using the Twister technique, this was the first Twister submission within the Bellator promotion.

He announced his retirement from MMA in 2017.

Mixed martial arts record

|-
| Win
| align=center| 20-9-1
| Ben Schneider
| TKO (strikes)
| CSFC 18
| 
| align=center| 1
| align=center| 1:25
| Doncaster, England
| 
|-
| Loss
| align=center| 19-9-1
| Andy DeVent
| KO (punches)
| ACB 54
| 
| align=center| 1
| align=center| 0:35
| Manchester, England
| 
|-
| Win
| align=center| 19-8-1
| Dan Sach
| Submission (armbar)
| Celtic Gladiator 10
| 
| align=center| 1
| align=center| 0:00
| London, England
| 
|-
| Loss
| align=center| 18-8-1
| Jake Bostwick
| KO (punch)
| ACB 47
| 
| align=center| 1
| align=center| 3:53
| Glasgow, Scotland
| 
|-
| Win
| align=center| 18-7-1
| CJ Meeks
| Submission (twister)
| Bellator 158
| 
| align=center| 1
| align=center| 4:25
| London, England
| 
|-
| Win
| align=center| 17-7-1
| Shaun Lomas
| Submission (heel hook)
| ICE FC 9
| 
| align=center| 1
| align=center| 0:00
| Manchester, England
| 
|-
| Win
| align=center| 16-7-1
| Brad Carter-Conway
| TKO (elbow)
| CSFC 12
| 
| align=center| 1
| align=center| 2:57
| Doncaster, England
| 
|-
| Loss
| align=center| 15-7-1
| Nikola Dipchikov
| Decision (unanimous)
| Twins MMA 10
| 
| align=center| 3
| align=center| 5:00
| Sofia, Bulgaria
| 
|-
| Win
| align=center| 15-6-1
| Kevin Reed
| TKO (elbows)
| CSFC 10
| 
| align=center| 2
| align=center| 2:07
| Doncaster, England
| 
|-
| Loss
| align=center| 14-6-1
| Wang Sai
| Decision (unanimous)
| UFC Fight Night 48
| 
| align=center| 3
| align=center| 5:00
| Macau, China
| 
|-
| Loss
| align=center| 14-5-1
| Igor Araujo
| Decision (unanimous)
| UFC Fight Night 37
| 
| align=center| 3
| align=center| 5:00
| London, England
| 
|-
| Win
| align=center| 14-4-1
| Besam Yousef
| Submission (rear-naked choke)
| Superior Challenge 9
| 
| align=center| 2
| align=center| 2:13
| Gothenburg, Sweden
| 
|-
| Win
| align=center| 13-4-1
| Victor Peixoto
| Submission (twister)
| Caged Fighters 6
| 
| align=center| 1
| align=center| 0:50
| Leeds, England
| 
|-
| Loss
| align=center| 12-4-1
| Kendall Grove
| TKO (punches)
| GWC 1: USA vs UK
| 
| align=center| 1
| align=center| 4:53
| Kansas City, Missouri, USA
| 
|-
| Win
| align=center| 12-3-1
| Lee Livesly
| TKO (punches)
| Caged Fury 1
| 
| align=center| 1
| align=center| 0:12
| Barnsley, England
| 
|-
| Win
| align=center| 11-3-1
| Malcolm Richardson
| KO (elbow)
| Cage Confrontation 6
| 
| align=center| 1
| align=center| 1:11
| York, England
| 
|-
| Win
| align=center| 10-3-1
| Dean Amasinger
| Submission (flying triangle choke)
| BAMMA 8
| 
| align=center| 2
| align=center| 2:28
| Nottingham, England
| 
|-
| Draw
| align=center| 9-3-1
| Cathal Pendred
| Decision (draw)
| Cage Warriors Fight Night 2
| 
| align=center| 3
| align=center| 5:00
| Amman, Jordan
| 
|-
| Loss
| align=center| 9-3
| Henrique Santana
| Decision (unanimous)
| WFC 1 
| 
| align=center| 3
| align=center| 5:00
| London, England
| 
|-
| Win
| align=center| 9-2
| Nico Musoke
| Submission (armbar)
| Superior Challenge 6
| 
| align=center| 2
| align=center| 1:56
| Stockholm, Sweden
| 
|-
| Loss
| align=center| 8-2
| Gunnar Nelson
| Submission (rear naked choke)
| Cage Contender 6
| 
| align=center| 1
| align=center| 2:51
| Manchester, England
| 
|-
| Loss
| align=center| 8-1
| Eugene Fadiora
| TKO (punches)
| Bushido Challenge 2
| 
| align=center| 3
| align=center| 2:19
| Nottingham, England
| 
|-
| Win
| align=center| 8-0
| Simon Phillips
| TKO (punches)
| KUMMA 4
| 
| align=center| 3
| align=center| 0:40
| Cheltenham, England
| 
|-
| Win
| align=center| 7-0
| Sami Berik
| Submission (rear naked choke)
| Bushido Challenge 1
| 
| align=center| 1
| align=center| 3:09
| Norwich, England
| 
|-
| Win
| align=center| 6-0
| Jordan James
| Submission (guillotine choke)
| KUMMA 3
| 
| align=center| 2
| align=center| 0:00
| Newport, Wales
| 
|-
| Win
| align=center| 5-0
| Leslee Ojugbana
| Submission (rear naked choke)
| Total Combat 31
| 
| align=center| 3
| align=center| 4:56
| Sunderland, England
| 
|-
| Win
| align=center| 4-0
| Lee Doski
| Submission (heel hook)
| Ultimate Force: Olivion
| 
| align=center| 1
| align=center| 2:01
| Doncaster, England
| 
|-
| Win
| align=center| 3-0
| Andrew McQueen
| Decision (split)
| Total Combat 28
| 
| align=center| 3
| align=center| 5:00
| Sunderland, England
| 
|-
| Win
| align=center| 2-0
| Runar Gundersen
| Decision (split)
| Total Combat 28
| 
| align=center| 3
| align=center| 5:00
| Sunderland, England
| 
|-
| Win
| align=center| 1-0
| Greg Letch
| Submission (Achilles lock)
| Ultimate Force: Nemesis
| 
| align=center| 1
| align=center| 1:59
| Doncaster, England
|

See also
List of current UFC fighters
List of male mixed martial artists

References

External links
Official UFC Profile

Living people
English male mixed martial artists
Middleweight mixed martial artists
1986 births
Ultimate Fighting Championship male fighters